William Brereton (circa 1726 – 5 January 1812) was an Anglican priest. He was educated at Eton College and Christ's College, Cambridge, and was rector of both Cottesmore, Rutland, and Pickwell, Leicestershire. He was Archdeacon of Stafford from 1782 to 1801.

References 

18th-century English Anglican priests
19th-century English Anglican priests
Archdeacons of Stafford
People educated at Eton College
Alumni of Christ's College, Cambridge
Year of birth uncertain
1812 deaths